is a former Japanese football player.

Playing career
Nishiyama was born in Kashiwa on February 22, 1975. After dropped out from high school, he moved to Brazil and joined Criciúma in 1992. In 1993, he returned to Japan and joined Fujita Industries (later Bellmare Hiratsuka). He debuted in 1994 and played many matches as offensive midfielder and forward. The club won the champions 1994 Emperor's Cup and 1995 Asian Cup Winners' Cup. However his opportunity to play decreased in 1999. In 2000, he moved to J2 League club Montedio Yamagata. He played as regular player in 2 seasons. In 2002, he moved to J2 club Oita Trinita. In 2002, he played as regular player and the club won the champions and was promoted to J1 League from 2003. From 2003, although he lost regular position, he played many matches as substitutes. In 2008, the club won the champions J.League Cup first major title in club history. However his opportunity to play decreased in 2009 and the club was relegated to J2 end of 2009 season. He retired end of 2009 season.

Club statistics

Honors and awards

Team
 Emperor's Cup Winner - 1994
 J.League Cup Winner - 2008
 Asian Cup Winners' Cup Winner - 1995

References

External links

Profile at Oita Trinita 

1975 births
Living people
People from Kashiwa
Association football people from Chiba Prefecture
Japanese footballers
J1 League players
J2 League players
Japan Football League (1992–1998) players
Shonan Bellmare players
Montedio Yamagata players
Oita Trinita players
Association football midfielders